The Lansford Historic District is a national historic district located at Lansford, Carbon County, Pennsylvania. It is part of the Lehigh Valley, which has a population of 861,899 and is the 68th most populated metropolitan area in the U.S. as of the 2020 census. 

It was listed on the National Register of Historic Places in 2012.

Gallery

References

Historic districts on the National Register of Historic Places in Pennsylvania
Italianate architecture in Pennsylvania
Buildings and structures in Carbon County, Pennsylvania
National Register of Historic Places in Carbon County, Pennsylvania